Sir Edward Henry Pelham  (20 December 1876 – 18 December 1949) was a British civil servant who was Permanent Secretary at the Board of Education between 1931 and 1937.

Early life and education

Pelham was born at 20 Bradmore Road in North Oxford, the eldest son of classical scholar Henry Francis Pelham, President of Trinity College, Oxford, and Laura Priscilla Buxton, daughter of Sir Edward Buxton, 2nd Baronet. His grandfather was Bishop of Norwich Hon. John Thomas Pelham, third son of the 3rd Earl of Chichester, whose father, the 2nd Earl, was a first cousin of Prime Ministers Henry Pelham and Thomas Pelham-Holles, 1st Duke of Newcastle. His younger brother was Bishop of Barrow-in-Furness Herbert Pelham.

He was educated at Harrow School and Balliol College, Oxford.

Career
At age 24, Pelham joined the Board of Education and steadily advanced. In 1920, he was appointed Principal Assistant Secretary. Nine years later, he was promoted to Deputy Secretary. He served as  Permanent Secretary from 1931 to his retirement in 1937.

He was appointed a Companion of the Order of the Bath (CB) in the 1921 New Year Honours and promoted to Knight Companion in the same order (KCB) in the 1933 New Year Honours.

Personal life

In 1905, Pelham married Hon. Irene Lubbock, fifth and youngest daughter of John Lubbock, 1st Baron Avebury and Alice Augusta Laurentius Lane-Fox, daughter of Augustus Pitt Rivers. They had two sons and three daughters:

Henry John Pelham (28 July 1907 – 28 May 1939), married Althea Muriel Beavan, daughter of James Riley Beavan
Alice Catherine Pelham (20 May 1911 – 19 June 1987), married Patrick Robert Sandars , son of Rev Canon George Russell Sandars
Irene Joan Pelham (19 December 1912 – 1 May 2002), married Brig. Maurice Leslie Hayne , son of Frederick Underwood Stokes Hayne
Maj. Eric Thomas Pelham (19 August 1915 – 8 January 1984), married Barbara Hilda Fordham, daughter of Henry John Fordham Hayne
Susan Pelham (30 July 1918 – 8 May 2006), married Air Vice Marshall Cresswell Clementi ,  son of Sir Cecil Clementi 

He died in 1949 in Oxford as a result of an accident, two days before his 73rd birthday. Lady Pelham died in 1961, aged 74.

References

External links

1876 births
1949 deaths
People educated at Harrow School
Alumni of Balliol College, Oxford
People from Oxford
Henry
Knights Commander of the Order of the Bath
English civil servants
Permanent Secretaries of the Board of Education